Mirmangan may refer to:
 Mirmangan-e Olya
 Mirmangan-e Sofla